Nakamura is the second studio album from French singer Aya Nakamura. It was released on 2 November 2018 through Warner Music France. A deluxe edition was also released on 25 October 2019.

The album features guest appearances by Davido, Maluma and Niska. It was preceded by six singles, which are: "Djadja", "Copines", "La Dot", "Pookie", "Soldat" and "40%" all of which reached the top 10 in Nakamura's home country France.

Track listing

Charts

Weekly charts

Year-end charts

Certifications and sales

References

2018 albums